Fabriciana argyrospilata is a species of butterfly of the family Nymphalidae. It has an eastern range in the Palearctic realm – Afghanistan, the western Pamirs, Pakistan, and northwest India. 
The species was first described by Hans Kotzsch in 1938.

References 

Fabriciana
Butterflies described in 1838